Trevor John Berry (born 1 August 1974) in Haslemere, England, is an English retired professional footballer who played as a midfielder mostly for Rotherham United. Whilst at Rotherham he was a part of the team that won the 1996 Football League Trophy Final.

References

1974 births
Living people
People from Haslemere
English footballers
Association football midfielders
AFC Bournemouth players
Aston Villa F.C. players
Rotherham United F.C. players
Scunthorpe United F.C. players
Waterford F.C. players
English Football League players